Sarah Song is professor of law and political science at the University of California, Berkeley. She is a political and legal theorist with a special interest in democratic theory and issues of citizenship, immigration, multiculturalism, gender, and race.

Biography

Born in Seoul, South Korea, Song immigrated to the United States at the age of six. She grew up in Kansas City, Missouri, and Belleville, Illinois, before moving to New Hampshire, where she attended Pinkerton Academy. She received her B.A. from Harvard University in 1996, an M.Phil from Oxford University in 1998, and a Ph.D. from Yale University in 2003.

Career and writing
Song is the first Korean American woman to receive tenure at Berkeley Law School and in the Berkeley Political Science Department. She is a popular teacher of a large undergraduate lecture course on justice at Berkeley. She has been awarded fellowships from the American Academy of Arts and Sciences and the Woodrow Wilson National Fellowship Foundation. She is the author of Justice, Gender, and the Politics of Multiculturalism, which was awarded the 2008 Ralph Bunche Award by the American Political Science Association for the "best scholarly work in political science that explores the phenomenon of ethnic and cultural pluralism." Prior to moving to Berkeley, she was an assistant professor of Political Science and affiliated faculty in Philosophy at the Massachusetts Institute of Technology.

Bibliography

Books

Selected articles

References

External links
 Person details - Sarah Song
 Faculty Profile - Sarah Song

Year of birth missing (living people)
Living people
American political philosophers
South Korean emigrants to the United States
UC Berkeley School of Law faculty
Harvard University alumni
Yale University alumni
Alumni of the University of Oxford
Pinkerton Academy alumni